Winston Swift Boyer (born June 25, 1954) is an American fine art photographer living in Carmel-by-the-Sea, California, and is best known for his color photography of landscapes in the United States and Europe. Since the late 1970s, Boyer's photography has engaged a wide variety of subject matter, including landscapes, architecture, portraits, and still-lifes. Boyer's first gallery exhibition was in 1979. He has exhibited in Paris, Canada, New York City, Massachusetts, and California. His work is included in permanent collections in the United States, including the Crocker Art Museum, Brooklyn Museum and the Art Institute of Chicago. Boyer is the author of American Roads, published by Little, Brown and Company, Bullfinch Press, a photographic chronicle of driving tours through the United States.

Early life

Boyer was born on June 25, 1954, in Great Falls, Montana. He is the son of Winston Philip Boyer (1915–2000) an inventor, geologist, and prospector, and Josephine "Josie" Swift (1921–2012) granddaughter of Arthur G. Leonard, president of the Chicago Stockyards. Josephine graduated from Bennington College with a degree in literature and fine art. At a very early age Winston moved to Moab, Utah, with his family where his father prospected for uranium. Winston’s early memories were the spectacular red rock landscapes of Arches National Park and the characters surrounding his mother and father including writer Edward Abbey, author of Desert Solitaire, who at the time was the park ranger for Arches. At age 10 his parents divorced, and Josephine took the family to Pebble Beach, California, and moved the family in with her mother, Lila Leonard Swift. Josephine became a school teacher and then moved the family to Carmel-by-the-Sea, California.

Winston attended Robert Louis Stevenson School in Pebble Beach. His brother, Jonathan, is a former professional cyclist who, in 1981, became the first American to participate in the Tour de France.

As a teenager, Winston attended a workshop at Point Lobos led by landscape photographer Ansel Adams. He attended Monterey Peninsula College, then traveled in Mexico and Guatemala and the United States before enrolling in the film department at San Francisco State University and later at the University of California, Santa Cruz, where he studied art history and cinematography. At UC Santa Cruz, Winston studied art history under Mary Holmes and film history under Tim Hunter in the early 1970s.

Career

In 1974, Boyer visited his brother, Jonathan, in France and got a job as a sports photographer covering bicycle racing. From 1976 to 1979, Boyer traveled to Italy, Germany, and France as a sports photographer for European and American publications. In 1984, he worked as a photographer for CBS Sports for the 1984 Tour de France. During these times in Europe he compiled fine art photographs of European landscapes, peoples, architecture, and exhibited in both American and European galleries. His Night Angel, a twilight photograph of an apartment building from Nice, France, and California Coastal Vista from Morro Bay, California, appeared in the publication of Time Life Books' 1981, in the chapter "The Artistry of Master Printmakers".

Ansel Adams attended Boyer's 1981 exhibition at the Sunset Center in Carmel. When Adams died on April 22, 1984, Boyer attended a reception five days later, with friends and fellow professionals, to open the Friends of Photography memorial exhibition for Adams at the Sunset Center. Boyer exhibited with the Friends of Photography organization in 1980 and 1985.

In the mid-1980s, while living in New York, Boyer received an advance from the Bulfinch Press imprint of Little, Brown and Company to travel the United States and assemble 64 photographs for the book American Roads. Travel writer and historian William Least Heat-Moon wrote the introduction to American Roads and said: 

Boyer was a senior photography director for an early online editorial fashion e-magazine called Fashionlines, from the late 1990s to the early 2000s.

His portfolio includes the Ocean Series, Mask Series, American Landscape, Vertigo Series, Cannery Row, American Facades, The Views,  European Gallery, and Eritrea, Africa. While living on Garrapata Ridge in Big Sur for fourteen years, his Ocean Series evolved into large-scale photographs of the sea, sky, and clouds, often at sunset, from vantages in and near Big Sur.

Venture artist Winter Lazerus interviewed Boyer in 2014 and asked him: 

In 2015, Boyer travelled to Eritrea, a country in the Horn of Africa region of Eastern Africa, where he photographed the people, landscapes, and architecture including the Hamasien Hotel, Fiat Tagliero Building, large hand-painted signs, street wall murals, Modernist architecture, and handmade terraces. The work was published as a piece called "Inside Eritrea: from tank cemeteries to futuristic architecture-in pictures" by The Guardian.

Boyer is featured in the book California Elegance Portraits from the Final Frontier, by Christine Suppes and Frederic Aranda published by Mondadori, released in March 2021.

Boyer now lives in Carmel-by-the-Sea, California, with his wife Kathleen and works as a fine art and commercial photographer. He considers color photography his medium, in the past using the Cibachrome printing process and now Archival Art Fine-Art Pigmented prints for the production of his fine art prints.

One-man exhibitions

Selected group exhibitions

Publications

Commissions

Permanent collections

See also
 Color photography

References

External links

 
 Gallery Sur, Winston Boyer Biography
 Gallery Sur, Winston Boyer Collections
 Matthew Swift Gallery, Gloucester, Massachusetts

1954 births
Photographers from California
People from Great Falls, Montana
People from Carmel-by-the-Sea, California
20th-century American photographers
21st-century American photographers
Landscape photographers
Nature photographers
Fine art photographers
Living people